Elwood Union Free School District is a school district in New York, United States. It serves residents in Elwood, Huntington, southeastern Greenlawn, and southwestern East Northport, all of which are communities in the Town of Huntington. The student enrollment is approximately 2,625.

The district includes one primary school which teaches kids though Kindergarten to 2nd grade (Harley Avenue Primary School and one intermediate school which teaches kids 3rd to 5th grade James H. Boyd Intermediate School), a middle school (Elwood Middle School), and a high school (Elwood-John H. Glenn High School).

The district offices are located inside Elwood Middle School.

History
The district was established in 1903 with the opening of the Elwood School on Cuba Hill Road (affectionately called the "Little Red Schoolhouse"), which operated as the sole school in the district for over 50 years. Cuba Hill School, which today is James H. Boyd School, opened further down the road in 1955, and Manor Plains School opened on Little Plains Road.

Elwood-John Glenn High School was constructed in 1962, followed by Harley Avenue School in 1966, and finally Elwood Middle School in 1968.

As of 2016, the district comprises four of its six total schools. The Elwood School has stood abandoned since 2003, and Manor Plains School has been converted into the Western Suffolk Boces: Wilson Technological Center.

In 2018, Elwood-John Glenn High School was named a National Blue Ribbon school.

References

External links

School districts in New York (state)
Huntington, New York
Education in Suffolk County, New York
School districts established in 1903